Sam Huntington (born April 1, 1982) is an American actor. He is best known for his starring role as Josh Levison, a werewolf in the Syfy series Being Human, and for his role as Jimmy Olsen in the superhero film Superman Returns. For its two seasons from September 2015 to April 2017, Huntington had a recurring role on the Fox series Rosewood.  He also played Mimi-Siku Cromwell in the Disney movie Jungle 2 Jungle. He played Ox in Not Another Teen Movie.  He also had a cameo in the December 2017 USA Network TV-film Psych: The Movie.

Early life 
Huntington was born in Peterborough, New Hampshire. He was raised in Hancock, New Hampshire. His mother, Christine Stabile, owned and operated the Black Box Theatre, where Huntington started his career. Huntington's great-uncle was actor Ralph Bellamy.

Career 
Huntington's first role was in the 1996 television movie Harvest of Fire, which starred Lolita Davidovich. He then appeared opposite Tim Allen in Disney's Jungle 2 Jungle the following year. He has appeared in films: Detroit Rock City, Not Another Teen Movie, Sleepover, Rolling Kansas, Freshman Orientation, In Enemy Hands and River's End. He has guest starred in CSI: Miami, CSI: NY, Law & Order, and Veronica Mars. He was also in the History Channel's documentary The States, when it covered New Hampshire.

Huntington appeared in Bryan Singer's 2006 film Superman Returns as Jimmy Olsen. He starred in the 2009 comedy film Fanboys, and again co-starred with Superman actor Brandon Routh in the live action film adaptation of Dylan Dog: Dead of Night.

In 2011, he was cast in the Syfy television series Being Human as Josh Levison, a werewolf. The series lasted four 13-episode seasons (a total of 52 episodes), and its final episode aired in April 2014. He also served as a guest on the second season of the reality television game show Face Off.

From autumn 2015 through spring 2017, Huntington appeared as the "special guest star" in his recurring role of quirky coroner Mitchie Mendelson on the Fox series Rosewood. The series was cancelled in May 2017 after two seasons.

On December 7, 2017, Huntington appeared briefly in the role of (detective) Sammy in USA Network's telefilm Psych: The Movie.

Personal life 
Huntington married actress and producer Rachel Klein in 2006.

Filmography

References 

1982 births
American male child actors
American male film actors
Living people
Male actors from New Hampshire
Actors from Manchester, New Hampshire
20th-century American male actors
21st-century American male actors
People from Peterborough, New Hampshire